"Hit-Medley" is the twentieth single by Dutch girl group Luv', released in 1990 by the labels Dureco/High Fashion Music in the Benelux and RCA Records/BMG in Germany. It appears on their 1989 EP For You. This medley is composed from parts of Luv's greatest hits re-recorded by a new formation (Marga Scheide, the only original member and two other vocalists Michelle Gold and Diana van Berlo).

Song history
When Luv' was reformed in 1989 with a new line-up, the goal was to reach the peak of the original trio. The new version of the pop act recorded new material produced by Nigel Wright and musically inspired by the Stock Aitken Waterman productions. It only scored a Top 30 hit in the Netherlands and in Flanders (Belgium) with the Welcome to My Party single. The follow-up singles didn't top the charts at all.

Then, a Dance Music medley (including five successful chart toppers from the original Luv's repertoire re-recorded by the 1989 formation) was released as a single. Once again, it failed to break into the hit lists.

Track listings and formats
 7" Vinyl Single
"Hit-Medley" (Single Version) — 3:59
"You're the Greatest Lover"/"Trojan Horse"/"Ooh, Yes I Do"/"Casanova"/"U.O.Me (Theme from Waldolala)"
"No Cure No Pay"  — 3:39

CD Single and 12-inch single
"Hit-Medley" (12-inch Version) — 7:14
Greatest Lover/Trojan Horse/Yes I Do/Casanova/U.O.Me
"Hit-Medley" (Single Version) — 3:59
Greatest Lover/Trojan Horse/Yes I Do/Casanova/U.O.Me
"No Cure No Pay"  — 3:39

References

1990 singles
1989 songs
Luv' songs
Dance-pop songs
Songs written by Hans van Hemert
Songs written by Piet Souer
Music medleys
Dureco singles